Frederick Wilson (13 August 1912, London, UK – August 1994, Cambridge) was a British film editor and director.

Selected filmography

Editor
 When Knights Were Bold (1936)
 London Melody (1937)
 Millions (1937)
 Stolen Life (1939)
 Under the Frozen Falls (1948)
 Doctor at
Sea (1955)
 All for Mary (1955)
 The Iron Petticoat (1956)
 Checkpoint (1956)
 Doctor at Large (1957)
 Campbell's Kingdom (1957)
 The Wind Cannot Read (1958)
 The Captain's Table (1959)
 North West Frontier (1959)
 I Aim at the Stars (1960)
 Mysterious Island (1961)
 Reach for Glory (1963)
 Lancelot and Guinevere (1963)
 Girl in the Headlines (1963)
 The Third Secret (1964)
 Rattle of a Simple Man (1964)
 The Amorous Adventures of Moll Flanders (1965)
 The Quiller Memorandum (1966)
 Arabesque (1966)
 The Big Game (1973)

Director
 Poet's Pub (1949)
 Floodtide (1949) (also one of its three writers)

References

External links
 

1912 births
1994 deaths
British film editors
Film people from London